Serghei Dubrovin (born January 4, 1952) is a Moldovan football manager who currently manages Milsami Orhei in the Moldovan National Division.

Managerial career
In March 2020, Dubrovin was appointed head coach of FC Milsami Orhei.

Hounors
PKT Bontang :
Liga Indonesia Premier Division runner-up : 1 (1999-2000)
Petrokimia Putra :
Liga Indonesia Premier Division champion : 1 (2002)

References

External links
 Serghei Dubrovin at soccerway

1952 births
Living people
Sportspeople from Bălți
Soviet footballers
Association football midfielders
Moldovan football managers
Moldovan expatriate football managers
Moldovan expatriates in Indonesia
Expatriate football managers in Indonesia
Indonesia Super League managers
PKT Bontang managers
Petrokimia Putra managers
Persija Jakarta managers
Persidafon Dafonsoro managers
FC Zimbru Chișinău managers
CSF Bălți managers
FC Milsami Orhei managers
Moldovan Super Liga managers